The Adventures of Prince Achmed (known as Die Abenteuer des Prinzen Achmed in German) is a 1926 German animated fairytale film by Lotte Reiniger. It is the oldest surviving animated feature film; two earlier ones were made in Argentina by Quirino Cristiani, but they are considered lost. The Adventures of Prince Achmed features a silhouette animation technique Reiniger had invented which involved manipulated cutouts made from cardboard and thin sheets of lead under a camera. The technique she used for the camera is similar to Wayang shadow puppets, though hers were animated frame by frame, not manipulated in live action. The original prints featured color tinting.

Several famous avant-garde animators worked on this film with Lotte Reiniger, among them Walter Ruttmann, Berthold Bartosch, and Carl Koch.

The story is based on elements from the One Thousand and One Nights written by Hanna Diyab, including "Aladdin" and "The Story of Prince Ahmed and the Fairy Perī-Bānū".

Plot
An African sorcerer conjures up a flying horse, which he shows to the Caliph. When the sorcerer refuses to sell it for any amount of gold, the Caliph offers any treasure he has. The sorcerer chooses Dinarsade, the Caliph's daughter, to her great distress. Prince Achmed, Dinarsade's brother, objects, but the sorcerer persuades him to try out the horse. It carries the prince away, higher and higher into the sky, as he doesn't know how to control it. The Caliph has the sorcerer imprisoned.

When Achmed discovers how to make the horse descend, he finds himself in a strange foreign land, a magical island called Wak Wak. He is greeted by a bevy of attractive maidens. When they begin fighting for his attention, he flies away to a lake. There, he watches as Pari Banu, the beautiful ruler of the land of Wak Wak, arrives with her attendants to bathe. When they spot him, they all fly away, except for Pari Banu, for Achmed has her magical flying feather costume. She flees on foot, but he captures her. He gains her trust when he returns her feathers. They fall in love. She warns him, however, that the demons of Wak Wak will try to kill him.

The sorcerer frees himself from his chains. Transforming himself into a bat, he seeks out Achmed. The prince chases the sorcerer (back in human form) and falls into a pit. While Achmed fights a giant snake, the sorcerer takes Pari Banu to China and sells her to the Emperor. The sorcerer returns and pins Achmed under a boulder on top of a mountain. However, the Witch of the Flaming Mountain notices him and rescues Achmed. The sorcerer is her arch-enemy, so she helps Achmed rescue Pari Banu from the Emperor. Then, the demons of Wak Wak find the couple and, despite Achmed's fierce resistance, carry Pari Banu off. Achmed forces a captive demon to fly him to Wak Wak. However, the gates of Wak Wak are locked.

He then slays a monster who is attacking a boy named Aladdin. Aladdin tells of how he, a poor tailor, was recruited by the sorcerer to retrieve a magic lamp from a cave. When Aladdin returned to the cave entrance, the sorcerer demanded the lamp before letting him out. Aladdin refused, so the sorcerer sealed him in. Aladdin accidentally released one of the genies of the lamp and ordered it to take him home. He then courted and married Dinarsade. One night, Dinarsade, Aladdin's magnificent palace, and the lamp disappeared. Blamed by the Caliph, Aladdin fled to avoid being executed. A storm at sea cast him ashore at Wak Wak. When he tried to pluck fruit from a "tree", it turned into a monster and grabbed him, but Achmed killed it.

Achmed realizes the sorcerer had been responsible behind this and is further enraged. He also reveals to Aladdin that his palace and the lamp were stolen by the sorcerer because of his obsession for Dinarsade. Then, the witch arrives. Since only the lamp can open the gates, she agrees to attack the sorcerer to get it. They engage in a magical duel, each transforming into various creatures. After a while, they resume their human forms and fling fireballs at each other. Finally, the witch slays the sorcerer. With the lamp, they are able to enter Wak Wak, just in time to save Pari Banu from being thrown to her death. A fierce battle erupts. A demon steals the lamp, but the witch gets it back. She summons creatures from the lamp who defeat the demons. One hydra-like creature seizes Pari Banu. When Achmed cuts off one of its heads, two more grow back immediately, but the witch stops this regeneration, allowing Achmed to kill it and rescue Pari Banu. A flying palace then settles to the ground. Inside, Achmed, Pari Banu, Aladdin, and the Caliph find Dinarsade. The two couples bid goodbye to the witch and fly home to the palace.

Production

Reiniger required several years, from 1923 to 1926, to make this film. Each frame had to be painstakingly filmed, and 24 frames were needed per second.

Restoration
No original German nitrate prints of the film are known to still exist. While the original film featured color tinting, prints available just before the restoration had all been in black and white. Working from surviving nitrate prints, German and British archivists restored the film during 1998 and 1999, including reinstating the original tinted image by using the Desmet method.

Availability 
The film is screened on the Turner Classic Movies channel. It was also once available to stream through the subscription-based FilmStruck. Filmstruck's follow-up service, Criterion Channel, a service from the Criterion Collection, began streaming it in Region 1 after the service shuttered in November 2018. English-market DVDs are available, distributed by Milestone Films and available in NTSC R1 (from Image) and PAL R2 (from the BFI). Both versions of the DVD are identical. They feature both an English-subtitled version (the intertitles are in German) and an English voice-over.

The English-subtitled film is available via Fandor and LiveTree.

Legacy 

A homage to this film can be spotted in Disney's Aladdin (1992); a character named Prince Achmed has a minor role in the film. The art style also served as inspiration for the Steven Universe episode "The Answer".

Score
The original score was composed by German composer Wolfgang Zeller in direct collaboration with the animation of the film. Reiniger created photograms for the orchestras, which were common in better theatres of the time, to follow along the action.

Contemporary scorings
 The Silk Road Ensemble accompanied the film with a live improvised performance on Western strings and instruments such as the oud, ney and sheng in October 2006 at the Rubin Museum of Art in New York, NY. The Silk Road Ensemble repeated the performance at the Avon Cinema in Providence, Rhode Island, in February 2007.
 London based band Little Sparta composed an original score to the film in 2007 with notable performances at Latitude Festival (2007), The Edinburgh Art Festival (2009) and Mekonville (2017). They have also had runs at theatres and venues in the UK and are continuing to perform it while releasing an EP of selected cues in June 2008.
New York City band Morricone Youth composed a new score for the film in 2012 and first performed it live at Nitehawk Cinema in Brooklyn on 28 September 2012. Country Club Records released a vinyl 6-song EP of the score in 2016.
 Spanish band Caspervek Trio composed a new soundtrack for the movie in 2014 premiered in Vigo, with further performances in Ourense, Liptovský Míkulás and Madrid.
 The Scottish jazz quartet, S!nk, composed and performed a new score for the film in 2017 as part of the Hidden Door arts festival in Edinburgh as part of a series of events celebrating the re-opening of the Leith Theatre after being closed for 25 years.
 Students from the Royal Birmingham Conservatoire composed a score for the film, which premiered at the Flatpack Film Festival at Dig Brew Co. on 22 April 2018 
 Chris Davies composed a new score for the opening night of the 2014 Bradford animation festival. Using a mixture of recorded and live instrumentation, he has continued touring extensively, playing live with the film throughout the UK and Europe.

Reception
The film made $100,156  during a 2007 re-issue.

References

External links

The Adventures of Prince Achmed at the TCM Movie Database
The Adventures of Prince Achmed at The Big Cartoon DataBase 
 
 
 

1926 animated films
1926 films
1920s fantasy films
Films based on Aladdin
Animated feature films
1920s children's fantasy films
Cutout animation films
Films directed by Lotte Reiniger
Films of the Weimar Republic
German animated films
German children's fantasy films
German silent feature films
1920s stop-motion animated films
Silhouettes
German black-and-white films
Silent horror films
1920s German films